Afro-Germans or Black Germans are people of Sub-Saharan African descent who are citizens or residents of Germany.

Cities such as Hamburg and Frankfurt, which were formerly centres of occupation forces following World War II and more recent immigration, have substantial Afro-German communities. With modern trade and migration, communities such as Frankfurt, Berlin, Munich, and Cologne have an increasing number of Afro-Germans. , in a country with a population of 83,000,000 people, there were an estimated 1,000,000 Afro-Germans.

History

African and German interaction 1600 to late 1800s 

During the 1720s, Ghana-born Anton Wilhelm Amo was sponsored by a German duke to become the first African to attend a European university; after completing his studies, he taught and wrote in philosophy. Later, Africans were brought as slaves from the western coast of Africa where a number of German estates were established, primarily on the Gold Coast. After King Friedrich Wilhelm I of Prussia sold his Ghana Groß Friedrichsburg estates in Africa in 1717, from which up to 30,000 people had been sold to the Dutch East India Company,  the new owners were bound by contract to "send 12 negro boys, six of them decorated with golden chains," to the king. The enslaved children were brought to Potsdam and Berlin.

Africans and German interaction between 1884 and 1945

At the 1884 Berlin Congo conference, attended by all major powers of the day, European states divided Africa into areas of influence which they would control. Germany controlled colonies in the African Great Lakes region and West Africa, from which numerous Africans migrated to Germany for the first time. Germany appointed indigenous specialists for the colonial administration and economy, and many young Africans went to Germany to be educated. Some received higher education at German schools and universities, but the majority were trained at mission training and colonial training centers as officers or domestic mission teachers. Africans frequently served as interpreters for African languages at German-Africa research centers, and with the colonial administration. Others migrated to Germany as former members of the German protection troops, the Askari.

The Afrikanisches Viertel in Berlin is also a legacy of the colonial period, with a number of streets and squares named after countries and locations tied to the German colonial empire. It is now home to a substantial portion of Berlin's residents of African heritage.

Interracial couples in the colonies were subjected to strong pressure in a campaign against miscegenation, which included invalidation of marriages, declaring the mixed-race children illegitimate, and stripping them of German citizenship. During extermination of the Nama people in 1907 by Germany, the German director for colonial affairs, Bernhard Dernburg, stated that "some native tribes, just like some animals, must be destroyed".

Weimar Republic

In the course of World War I, the Belgians, British and French took control of Germany's colonies in Africa. The situation for the African colonials in Germany changed in various ways. For example, Africans who possessed a colonial German identification card had a status entitling them to treatment as  "members of the former protectorates". After the Treaty of Versailles (1919), the Africans were encouraged to become citizens of their respective mandate countries, but most preferred to stay where they were. In numerous petitions (well documented for German Togoland by P. Sebald and for Cameroon by A. Rüger), they tried to inform the German public about the conditions in the colonies, and continued to request German help and support.

Africans founded the bilingual periodical that was published in German and Duala: Elolombe ya Cameroon (Sun of Cameroon). A political group of Africans established the German branch of a Paris-based human-rights organization: "the German section of the League to the Defense of the Negro Race".

Nazi Germany

The conditions for Afro-Germans in Germany grew worse during the Nazi period. Naturalized Afro-Germans lost their passports. Working conditions and travel were made extremely difficult for Afro-German musicians, variety, circus or film professionals. Based on racist propaganda, employers were unable to retain or hire Afro-German employees.

Afro-Germans in Germany were socially isolated and forbidden to have sexual relations and marriages with Aryans by the Nuremberg Laws. In continued discrimination directed at the so-called Rhineland bastards, Nazi officials subjected some 500 Afro-German children in the Rhineland to forced sterilization. Afro-Germans were considered "enemies of the race-based state", along with Jews and Roma. The Nazis originally sought to rid the German state of Jews and Romani by means of deportation (and later extermination), while Afro-Germans were to be segregated and eventually exterminated through compulsory sterilization.

Some Black Germans who lived through this period later wrote about their experiences. In 1999 Hans Massaquoi published Destined to Witness about his life in Germany under Nazi rule, and in 2013 Theodor Wonja Michael, who was also the main witness in the documentary film Pages in the Factory of Dreams, published his autobiography, Deutsch Sein Und Schwarz Dazu.

Since 1945 

The end of World War II brought Allied occupation forces into Germany. American, British and French forces included numerous soldiers of African American, Afro-Caribbean or African descent, and some of them fathered children with ethnic German women. At the time, these armed forces generally maintained non-fraternization rules and discouraged civilian-soldier marriages. Around 8,000 of these biracial Afro German children were born immediately after the war, making up about 1% of all births in ethnically homogeneous West Germany in 1945. " Most single ethnic German mothers kept their "brown babies", but thousands were adopted by American families and grew up in the United States. Often they did not learn their full ancestry until reaching adulthood.

Until the end of the Cold War, the United States kept more than 100,000 U.S. soldiers stationed on German soil. These men established their lives in Germany. They often brought families with them or founded new ones with ethnic German wives and children. The federal government of West Germany pursued a policy of isolating or removing from Germany those children that it described as "mixed-race negro children".

Audre Lorde, Black American writer and activist, spent the years from 1984 to 1992 teaching at the Free University of Berlin. During her time in Germany, often called "The Berlin Years," she helped push the coining of the term "Afro-German" into a movement that addressed the intersectionality of race, gender, and sexual orientation. She encouraged Black German women such as May Ayim and Ika Hügel-Marshall to write and publish poems and autobiographies as a means of gaining visibility and. She pursued intersectional global feminism and acted as an advocate for that movement in Germany.

Immigration

Since 1981, Germany has had immigration from African countries, mostly Nigeria and Ghana, who were seeking work. Some of the Ghanaians also came to study in German universities.

Below are the largest (Sub-Saharan) African groups in Germany.

Afro-Germans in literature

  Novel about a multiracial jazz group in Nazi Germany. The band's young trumpeter is a Rhineland Bastard who eventually is taken by the Nazis, while other members of the band are African Americans.
  Novel about a faith healer and rock band manager, featuring an Afro-German character, Josef Ehelich von Fremd, an affluent fellow who works in arbitrage and owns fine racehorses.

  An autobiography by Hans J. Massaquoi, born in Hamburg, Germany, to a German mother and a Liberian father of Vai ethnicity, the grandson of Momulu Massaquoi.
Ika Hügel-Marshall. (2008) Marshall wrote an autobiography "Daheim unterwegs: Ein deutsches Leben", the English translation of which is entitled "Invisible Woman: Growing up Black in Germany". She details her life experiences growing up as an "occupation baby" and the struggle to find her identity as she grows up. Marshall details how the society she grew up in taught her to hate her complexion and how meeting her father, a black man, instilled a renewed pride in her heritage. The autobiography culminates in the struggle to find information on her father in the United States and finally getting to meet her American family.
Iljoma Mangold. (2017) Mangold wrote an autobiography "Das deutsche Krokodil", the English translation of which is entitled "The German Crocodile: A literary memoir" (2021), about growing up in Germany in the 1970s.

Afro-German political groups

Initiative of Black People (Initiative Schwarzer Deutscher) 
 This initiative created a political community that offers support for black people in Germany. Its main goals are to give people a chance to have their voices heard by each other and by those who do not share the same experiences. In the space provided by ISD gatherings, Afro-Germans are able to connect with people who might be in similar situations and who can offer them support.
 Teachings from the ISD emphasise the role of history in understanding current politics. This is because of the belief that Germany has committed numerous atrocities in the past (notably in South-West Africa), but has no intentions of paying reparations to communities that still suffer today. The ISD notes that the importance of paying these reparations are for the structural changes made to a broken, discriminatory system.
 The ISD combats discrimination in Germany through active support, campaigning through the media, and outreach to the government.

Notable Afro-Germans in modern Germany

Politics and social life 
 Joe Chialo (born 1970), candidate for the Bundestag in 2021
 Karamba Diaby (born 1961), Afro-German politician, member of the Bundestag.
 John Ehret (born 1971), Germany's first Afro-German mayor.
 Pierrette Herzberger-Fofana (born 1949), The only black MEP to represent Germany following the 2019 European elections.
 Charles M. Huber (born 1956),  Afro-German politician and former actor, member of the Bundestag.
 Ika Hügel-Marshall (born 1947), wrote about growing up in postwar Germany
 Bärbel Kampmann (1946–1999), anti-racist activist and writer
 Hans Massaquoi (1926-2013), journalist, wrote about his childhood in Nazi Germany.
 Aminata Touré (born 1992), Minister of Social Affairs, Youth, Family, Senior Citizens, Integration and Equality of the State of Schleswig-Holstein
 Harald Weyel, politician, member of the Bundestag.

Art, culture and music 
The cultural life of Afro-Germans has great variety and complexity. With the emergence of MTV and Viva, the popularity of American pop culture promoted Afro-German representation in German media and culture.

May Ayim (1960-1996), was an Afro-German poet, educator and activist. She was a co-editor of the book Farbe bekennen, whose English translation was published as Showing Our Colors: Afro-German Women Speak Out.

Afro-German musicians include:

Film  and television 

The SFD - Schwarze Filmschaffende in Deutschland (Black Filmmakers in Germany) is a professional association based in Berlin for directors, producers, screenwriters, and actors who are Afro-Germans or of Black African origin and living in Germany. They have organized the "New Perspectives" series at the Berlinale film festival.

Afro-Germans in film and television include:
 Adunni Ade (born 1970)
 Mo Asumang (born 1963)
 Zazie Beetz (born 1991)
 Louis Brody (1892–1952)
 Nisma Cherrat (born 1969)
 Carol Campbell (born 1966)
 Elfie Fiegert (born 1946)
 Florence Kasumba (born 1976)
 Günther Kaufmann (1947–2012)
 Boris Kodjoe (born 1973)
 Leila Negra (born 1930)
 Araba Walton (born 1975)

Sport

See also

 Demographics of Germany
 Afro-European

Notes

References

Further reading

May Ayim, Katharina Oguntoye, and Dagmar Schultz. Showing Our Colors: Afro-German Women Speak Out (1986). Amherst: University of Massachusetts Press, 1992.
Campt, Tina. Other Germans Black Germans and the Politics of Race, Gender, and Memory in the Third Reich. Ann Arbor: University of Michigan, 2004.
El-Tayeb, Fatima. European Others: Queering Ethnicity in Postnational Europe. Minneapolis, MN: University of Minnesota Press, 2011.
Hine, Darlene Clark, Trica Danielle Keaton, and Stephen Small, eds. Black Europe and the African Diaspora. Urbana: University of Illinois Press, 2009.
American Institute for Contemporary German Studies. Who Is a German?: Historical and Modern Perspectives on Africans in Germany. Ed. Leroy Hopkins. Washington, D.C: American Institute for Contemporary German Studies, the Johns Hopkins University, 1999.
Lemke Muniz de Faria, Yara-Colette. "'Germany's "Brown Babies" Must Be Helped! Will You?': U.S. Adoption Plans for Afro-German Children, 1950–1955." Callaloo 26.2 (2003): 342–362.
Mazón, Patricia M., and Reinhild Steingröver, eds. Not so Plain as Black and White: Afro-German Culture and History, 1890–2000. Rochester, NY: University of Rochester Press, 2005.
Weheliye, Alexander G. Phonographies: Grooves in Sonic Afro-Modernity. Duke University Press, 2005.

External links 
 Black German Heritage and Research Association
 Black German Cultural Society Inc
 African Union Diaspora Committee Deutschland Zentralrat der Afrikanischen Diaspora Deutschland mit Mandat der Afrikanischen Union 
 May Ayim Award - The 1st Black German International Literature Award
 Initiative Schwarze Menschen in Deutschland
 African Diaspora in Germany 
 cyberNomads - The Black German Databank Network and Media Channel Our Knowledge Resource on the Net
 SFD – Schwarze Filmschaffende in Deutschland
 United States Holocaust Memorial Museum Bibliography
 Pocast in which Fatima El-Tayeb (Director of the Critical Gender Studies programme at the University of California, San Diego) talks about the need to reassess Europe’s internalist narrative and the discourse of integration.

African diaspora in Germany
Culture of the African diaspora